is a mat hold described in the Canon Of Judo. Changes to the International Judo Federation Rules in October 2013 made it a legitimate hold (osaekomi) for competition. In 2017, it was added as an official named technique by the Kodokan. It can be used as a turtle turnover as demonstrated in The Essence Of Judo by Kyuzo Mifune. It is categorized as Katame-waza (grappling technique).

Similar techniques, variants, and aliases 
English aliases:
Back hold

References 

 

Judo technique